Gagatophorus tibialis is a weevil in the Amycterini tribe of the Curculionidae family, endemic to Western Australia.

The species  was first described by Eustace William Ferguson in 1914 as Macramycterus tibialis, from a specimen collected at Shark Bay, Western Australia, and was transferred to the genus, Gagatophorus, in 1993 by Elwood Curtin Zimmerman.

References

External links
Gagatophorus tibialis: images & occurrence data from Atlas of Living Australia

Curculionidae

Insects of Australia

Insects described in 1914
Taxa named by Eustace William Ferguson